Antiguan raisin buns, also known as "bun and cheese" because it is eaten with cheese. It’s traditional bread from the island of Antigua, in the West Indies. It is a sweet, enriched raisin bread made with ingredients such as sugar, butter, eggs, and sometimes spices like nutmeg. It is typically baked in a round shape, typically eaten with cheese. While eaten year round, it is most popular during Easter.

Ingredients: 
 Flour
 Instant Yeast
 butter
 Milk 
 Raisins
 Brown Sugar
 Salt 
 Mixed Spices

Method: 
Prepare a baking sheet lined with parchment or a silicone baking mat. Warm milk and melt butter and add ingredients in stages to a mixing bowl. First add yeast, warmed milk, and sugar, then add flour followed by salt and melted butter. Mix on speed 2-3 for 8 mins, check for dough development then gradually increase the speed to 6 for another 10-12 minutes. Gradually add spices while your dough is mixing, then add raisins. Once the dough is fully developed round dough on a work surface and rest for 30 minutes. After resting, give the dough a final shaping before proofing. The dough can be divided into 2 equal portions or can be baked as 1.

Increasing or decreasing the amount of ingredients helps achieve your desired taste or texture. Bun can be mixed by hand as well. Fresh yeast can be used, as long as it is properly converted. Your environment determines the rest and mixing times of dough. Let bun cool completely before cutting it or else it will look gummy. This bun is best eaten warm with butter and cheese!

References 

Antigua and Barbuda culture